Sphaceloma menthae is a plant pathogen infecting mint. It is also known as mint anthracnose or leopard spot disease. It can be identified by circular, oval, or irregular spots on the mint plant. It used to be a serious disease but it now controlled in commercial mint fields.

References

External links
 USDA ARS Fungal Database

Fungal plant pathogens and diseases
Mint diseases
Myriangiales
Fungi described in 1937